is a Japanese author of several light novel adaptations of manga, anime and visual novel series. This includes a single novel adaptation of Kashimashi: Girl Meets Girl, a manga originally written by Satoru Akahori and illustrated by Yukimaru Katsura. Komao also wrote five light novels based on the Gift visual novel and wrote the original concept for the manga series the First Love Sisters.

Works
 First Love Sisters, serialized in Yuri Shimai and then Comic Yuri Hime magazine, 2003–08, 3 volumes, Story
 Kashimashi: Girl Meets Girl, published by 2006, 1 volume
 Togainu no Chi True Blood, published by Kadokawa, 2009, 1 volume
 Ange Vierge Linkage, serialized in Kadokawa's Dragon Age magazine, 2014–15, Writer, 2 volumes
 BlazBlue light novels, author
 Blazblue: Phase 0, published by Kadokawa, 2010
 BlazBlue: Phase Shift, published by Kadokawa, 2010–12, 4 volumes
 BlazBlue 1: Calamity Trigger (above), published by Kadokawa, 2013
 BlazBlue 2: Calamity Trigger (below), published by Kadokawa, 2013
 BlazBlue 3: Calamity Trigger (above), published by Kadokawa, 2013
 BlazBlue 4: Continuum Shift (below), published by Kadokawa, 2014
 BlazBlue Bloodedge Experience, published by Kadokawa, 2014, 2 volumes
 BlazBlue: Spiral Shift – Hero of the Frozen Blade, 2016

References

External links
 Mako Komao at Kadokawa 
 

Japanese writers
Living people
Light novelists
1982 births